Bainskloof Pass is a mountain pass on the R301 regional road between Wellington and Ceres in the Western Cape province of South Africa. The 18-kilometer (11-mile) pass, opened in 1854, was constructed by road engineer Andrew Geddes Bain with the use of convict labour. Originally built for horse-drawn traffic, the pass was later tarred.

The pass reaches  at its highest point. Here, the road joins the Witte River, which descends the northern side of the mountains through a precipitous cleft to a stretch of rapids, waterfalls and natural pools. Bainskloof Pass is now a national monument.

After roadworks starting in 2018, it finally reopened to the public in June 2022.

See also 
 Andrew Geddes Bain
 Bainskloof moss frog
 Bain's Cape Mountain Whisky

References

External links 
 Passes Index at Wild Dog Adventure Riding website
 Bainskloof history 

Mountain passes of the Western Cape
1854 establishments in the Cape Colony